Madanapala may refer to:

 Madanapala (Gahadavala dynasty) (r. c. 1104–1113 CE), Indian king
 Madanapala (Pala dynasty) (r. c. 1144–1162 CE), Indian king